The 2017–18 season was the Persepolis's 17th season in the Pro League, and their 35th consecutive season in the top division of Iranian Football. They were also be competing in the Hazfi Cup, Super Cup and AFC Champions League.

Squad

First team squad

New Contracts

Transfers

In

Out

Technical staff 

|}

Competitions

Overview

Persian Gulf Pro League

Standings

Results summary

Results by round

Matches

Hazfi Cup

Matches

Super Cup

AFC Champions League

2017 AFC Champions League

2018 AFC Champions League

Group stage

Matches

Round of 16

Friendly Matches

Pre-season

During season

Statistics

Scorers

Assists

Goalkeeping

Disciplinary record

Bookings & sending-off

Suspensions

Club

Kit 

|- style="vertical-align: top;"
|

|

|

|

|}

Sponsorship 

Main sponsor: Irancell
Official shirt manufacturer: Joma
Official sponsor: Kosar Credit Cooperative

References

External links 
Iran Premier League Statistics
Persian League
Persepolis News

Persepolis F.C. seasons
Persepolis